Bunmi Makinwa (Yoruba: Bùnmi Mákínwá; born 1955) is the Chief Executive Officer of AUNIQUEI, a private entrepreneurial initiative in communication for leadership. He is a leader in management, communication, and development. Previously, he was the Africa Regional Director of the United Nations Population Fund (UNFPA); Director of UNAIDS New York Office; Director and Representative of UNAIDS to the Africa Union Commission in Addis Ababa. He has worked for Family Health International (FHI), Programme for Appropriate Technology for Health (PATH) and World Health Organization. Makinwa was Nigeria's candidate for the post of Executive Director of UNFPA in 2010. He is currently the Chair of the Board of African Population and Health Research Center (APHRC).

His career trajectory includes teaching, journalism, executive management and leadership, international development, freelance writer and author. He is a commentator on politics, political leadership, elections, social media, music and the life of impactful individuals. 

He also runs a blog titled "Politics, Policies, Poetry and Life in Africa."

He studied at University of Ife (Obafemi Awolowo University), University of Ibadan, University of Cape Town, Saarland University, University of Dijon, Harvard University, United Nations System Staff College and University of South Africa. At the University of Ife he was a student leader and life member of the Students' Union.  

From 1987 to 2013, he was based in Senegal, the Republic of Congo, United States, Kenya, Switzerland, South Africa, Ethiopia and he worked in many countries across the world.

Education and career 
Makinwa was born in Ilesa, Nigeria. He has two degrees from the University of Ibadan, Nigeria, where he graduated with a Bachelor of Arts in Modern Languages, with a concentration in French and German, in 1980, and a Master of Arts in Philosophy, with a concentration in Political Philosophy, in 1985. He later studied at the John F. Kennedy School of Government at Harvard University, where he obtained a Master of Public Administration in 1993 with a concentration in management and policy.

He is a commentator on politics and public affairs. He writes analytical columns and opinions for news media and online publications including The Guardian, Daily Trust, and Business Day (Nigeria) newspapers in Nigeria, Sahara Reporters, AllAfrica, TheCable, Premium Times, Realnews, and Africa Development Talk. 

He serves on the Boards of several businesses and not-for-profit organizations including the ONE Campaign Africa Policy Advisory Board and Social Workers Beyond Borders. He is a former Chairman and member of the Advisory Board of the Division of Social and Behaviour Change Communications at Wits University, Johannesburg, South Africa. 
In June 2012, Makinwa led UNFPA Africa Region to conclude an implementing partnership agreement with Africa Centre for HIV/AIDS Management at Stellenbosch University in South Africa. In the same year, he signed a second agreement between UNFPA and University of Ibadan, Nigeria.

Works 

He authored and co-authored the following publications:

 Bunmi Makinwa, Population and Culture, 21 B.C. Envtl. Aff. L. Rev. 291 (1994)
 Communications Framework for HIV/AIDS: A New Direction
 Social Marketing: An effective tool in the global response to HIV/AIDS
 HIV/AIDS Prevention in the context of new therapies
 Male Latex Condom 
 Communications programming for HIV/AIDS: An annotated bibliography
 Print and AudioVisual production of Fleet of Hope
 Social marketing – Expanding access to essential products and services
 Health Communications for HIV/AIDS in the following millennium, published in the Journal of Health Communication
 Special production of a supplement issue of the Journal of Health Communication - International Perspectives
 Technical Update on Condoms
 Radio and HIV/AIDS: Making a Difference
 Directory of Social Marketing Projects
 Communication Handbook on Vaccine Trials for HIV/AIDS

Professional associations 
 Fellow, Harvard Institute for International Development 
 Member, International Communication Association 
 Member, Association of Communication Scholars and Professionals of Nigeria
 Member, International Science Writers' Association 
 Member, African Council for Communication Education 
 Associate Fellow, Coolidge Center for Environmental Leadership 
 Member, International Society for AIDS Education

Awards and honours 
 Certificate of Merit, All Nigeria United Nations Students Association. 1976
 Life Membership, University of Ife (now Obafemi Awolowo University) Students Union, Nigeria. 1977
 Fellow, Edward S. Mason Program in Public Policy and Management, Harvard University, USA. 1993 
 Grand Commander of the National Order of Benin Republic – conferred by the government of the Republic of Benin.

References

External links 
	Makinwa, Bunmi. (2014). Ekiti Elections: What If?
	Makinwa, Bunmi. (2014). TB Joshua: The Good And The Ugly
	Makinwa, Bunmi. (2014). South Africa’s Oscar Pistorius And Guns
	Makinwa, Bunmi. (2014). African Presidents Do Not Take their Medicines
	Makinwa, Bunmi. (2014). President Jonathan Says No But What Do People Say?
	Makinwa, Bunmi. (2014). On Fence Climbing By Legislator
	Bunmi Makinwa Twitter.

University of Ibadan alumni
Living people
People from Osun State
1955 births
Yoruba people
Harvard Kennedy School alumni
Nigerian chief executives